Henry Howard (25 July 1802 – 7 January 1875) was a British Member of Parliament.

Early life
Howard was born on 25 July 1802. He was the eldest son of Lord Henry Howard-Molyneux-Howard and Elizabeth Long. His sisters included Henrietta Molyneux-Howard (wife of Henry Herbert, 3rd Earl of Carnarvon), Isabella Howard (wife of Charles Howard, 17th Earl of Suffolk), Charlotte Howard (wife of James Wentworth Buller), and Juliana Howard (wife of Sir John Ogilvy, 9th Baronet).

His maternal grandfather was Edward Long, the British colonial administrator, historian and author. His paternal grandparents were Henry Howard and Juliana Molyneux (a daughter of Sir William Molyneux, 6th Baronet). His grandfather was a descendant of Bernard Howard, a younger son of Henry Howard, 22nd Earl of Arundel and younger brother of the 5th and 6th Dukes of Norfolk. Howard's uncle, Bernard Howard inherited the Dukedom of Norfolk in 1815 and his father was, in 1817, granted the courtesy title "Lord", the style of a younger son of a duke.

Career
Howard inherited Greystoke Castle from his father in 1824. He represented the constituencies of Steyning from 30 June 1824 to 8 June 1826 and New Shoreham from 16 June 1826 to 15 December 1832. He was also the High Sheriff of Cumberland in 1834.

Howard was also a first-class cricketer, making three first-class appearances, one each for the Marylebone Cricket Club in 1830, for a team of single men in 1831, and for Sussex in 1832.

Personal life
On 6 December 1849, Howard was married to Charlotte Caroline Georgina Long, daughter of Henry Lawes Long and Catharine Long of Hampton Lodge, Surrey, by whom he had:

 Henry Howard (1850–1914), who married and had issue
 Stafford Howard (1851–1916), who married and had issue.
 Robert Mowbray Howard DL (1854–1928), who married Louisa Georgina Sneyd (granddaughter of Walter Sneyd MP) and had issue.
 Elizabeth Catherine Howard (1856–1929), who married her first cousin Henry Herbert, 4th Earl of Carnarvon and had issue including Aubrey Herbert whose daughter Laura became the second wife of writer Evelyn Waugh.
 Maud Isabel Howard (1858–1929), who married Francis William Leyborne Popham, of Littlecote House.
 Esme Howard (1863–1939), who married and had issue.

Descendants
His grandson, Mervyn Herbert, was also a first-class cricketer.

See also
Politics of the United Kingdom

References

External links 
 

1802 births
1875 deaths
Henry Howard
Members of the Parliament of the United Kingdom for English constituencies
UK MPs 1820–1826
UK MPs 1826–1830
UK MPs 1830–1831
UK MPs 1831–1832
High Sheriffs of Cumberland
English cricketers
Marylebone Cricket Club cricketers
Sussex cricketers
English cricketers of 1826 to 1863